Microdriles (small worms) are mostly aquatic or semi-terrestrial oligochaetes.

References 

Clitellata
Invertebrate common names